Harshad Joshi is a television show director best known for directing Taarak Mehta Ka Ooltah Chashmah, an Indian sitcom.

See also
Television in India

References

Living people
Year of birth missing (living people)
Place of birth missing (living people)
Indian television directors